Jack Taylor (born George Brown Randall; October 21, 1936) is an American actor best known for starring in many European low-budget exploitation films of the 1970s, in particular several directed by Spanish cult filmmaker Jesús Franco. Born in the Portland, Oregon suburb of Oregon City, Taylor began acting onstage as a child. In the 1950s, he began appearing in small roles on Los Angeles-based television series before moving to Mexico and starring in several films directed by Federico Curiel.

Taylor had several minor roles in films in the early 1960s, including Cleopatra (1963) and Custer of the West (1966) before having a lead role in Jesús Franco's Succubus (1968). Taylor subsequently relocated to Madrid, and appeared in numerous exploitation and horror films there, including Count Dracula (1970), Eugenie… The Story of Her Journey into Perversion (also 1970), Female Vampire (1973), and Pieces (1982).

Taylor's later roles include 1492: Conquest of Paradise (1992), Roman Polanski's The Ninth Gate (1999),A2Z by Daryush Shokof, (2004) and Miloš Forman's Goya's Ghosts (2006).

Early life 
Taylor was born George Brown Randall on October 21, 1936 in Oregon City, Oregon, a suburb of Portland. He began acting as a child, first appearing in a stage production of Macbeth.

Career
He adopted the stage name Jack Taylor and began his acting career in small roles in 1950s American TV shows such as The Jack Benny Program and Sheena, Queen of the Jungle. He relocated to Mexico in the late 1950s and starred in a number of films for director Federico Curiel, often vehicles for the Mexican characters Nostradamus the Vampire and the superhero Neutron. Reportedly, he moved to Europe to appear in Elizabeth Taylor's epic Cleopatra (1963), but his small part ended up uncredited.

Taylor had a minor role in the international co-production sou Robert Siodmak's Custer of the West (1966).

In 1967, Taylor began his prolific collaboration with Jesús Franco in Succubus (1968, his first onscreen lead role) and Eugenie… The Story of Her Journey into Perversion (1970). He went on to play Quincey Morris in the 1970 Franco opus Count Dracula alongside Christopher Lee, Herbert Lom, Soledad Miranda and Klaus Kinski, before appearing in many of Franco's softcore films, most famously Female Vampire (1973) with Lina Romay.

During this period, Taylor also co-starred with Spanish horror star Paul Naschy in Dr. Jekyll vs. The Werewolf (1971) and The Mummy's Revenge (1975) and worked for director Amando de Ossorio on three occasions, on The Ghost Galleon (1974), Night of the Sorcerers (1974) and The Sea Serpent (1985). He appeared in León Klimovsky's The Vampires Night Orgy (1972) and the Italian giallo film Red Rings of Fear (1978). Juan Piquer Simón directed him in two films, a Jules Verne adventure film called Where Time Began (1978) and the gory cult film Pieces (1982). Taylor next appeared as a priest in John Milius' Conan the Barbarian (1982).

José Ramón Larraz directed Taylor in two other Spanish slasher films: Rest in Pieces (1987) and Edge of the Axe (1988). He also had a supporting role in Ridley Scott's 1492: Conquest of Paradise (1992), and later co-starred with Johnny Depp in Roman Polanski's horror film The Ninth Gate (1999).

He next appears in André Téchiné's Loin (2001), and Miloš Forman's Goya's Ghosts (2006). Taylor had a supporting role in  Son of Cain (2013), followed by Grand Piano (also 2013), starring Elijah Wood and John Cusack.

Select filmography

References

Sources

External links

1936 births
Living people
American male film actors
American male television actors
American expatriates in Spain
Male actors from Oregon
People from Oregon City, Oregon